Laurits Theodor Christian Larsen (8 April 1872 – 28 June 1949) was a Danish sport shooter who competed in the 1912 Summer Olympics and in the 1920 Summer Olympics.

In 1912 he won the bronze medal as member of the Danish team in the team free rifle competition. In the team military rifle event he finished eighth. In the 50 metre pistol competition he finished 21st and in the 300 metre free rifle, three positions event he finished 33rd. Eight years later he finished fourth in the 50 metre free pistol competition.

References

External links
profile

1872 births
1949 deaths
Danish male sport shooters
ISSF rifle shooters
ISSF pistol shooters
Olympic shooters of Denmark
Shooters at the 1912 Summer Olympics
Shooters at the 1920 Summer Olympics
Olympic bronze medalists for Denmark
Olympic medalists in shooting
Medalists at the 1912 Summer Olympics